Action theory (or theory of action) is an area in philosophy concerned with theories about the processes causing willful human bodily movements of a more or less complex kind. This area of thought involves epistemology, ethics, metaphysics, jurisprudence, and philosophy of mind, and has attracted the strong interest of philosophers ever since Aristotle's Nicomachean Ethics (Third Book). With the advent of psychology and later neuroscience, many theories of action are now subject to empirical testing.

Philosophical action theory, or the philosophy of action, should not be confused with sociological theories of social action, such as the action theory established by Talcott Parsons.  Nor should it be confused with activity theory.

Overview 
Basic action theory typically describes action as intentional behavior caused by an agent in a particular situation. The agent's desires and beliefs (e.g. my wanting a glass of water and believing that the clear liquid in the cup in front of me is water) lead to bodily behavior (e.g. reaching across for the glass). In the simple theory (see Donald Davidson), the desire and belief jointly cause the action. Michael Bratman has raised problems for such a view and argued that we should take the concept of intention as basic and not analyzable into beliefs and desires.

Aristotle held that a thorough scientific analysis must give an account of both the efficient cause, the agent, and the final cause, the intention.

In some theories a desire plus a belief about the means of satisfying that desire are always what is behind an action. Agents aim, in acting, to maximize the satisfaction of their desires. Such a theory of prospective rationality underlies much of economics and other social sciences within the more sophisticated framework of rational choice. However, many theories of action argue that rationality extends far beyond calculating the best means to achieve one's ends. For instance, a belief that I ought to do X, in some theories, can directly cause me to do X without my having to want to do X (i.e. have a desire to do X). Rationality, in such theories, also involves responding correctly to the reasons an agent perceives, not just acting on wants.

While action theorists generally employ the language of causality in their theories of what the nature of action is, the issue of what causal determination comes to has been central to controversies about the nature of free will.

Conceptual discussions also revolve around a precise definition of action in philosophy. Scholars may disagree on which bodily movements fall under this category, e.g. whether thinking should be analysed as action, and how complex actions involving several steps to be taken and diverse intended consequences are to be summarised or decomposed.

Scholars 

 Aristotle
 Thomas Aquinas
 David Hume
 Georg Wilhelm Friedrich Hegel
 Friedrich Nietzsche
 Max Weber
 Talcott Parsons
 Ludwig Wittgenstein
 Hannah Arendt
 Jürgen Habermas
 Paul Ricoeur
 G. E. M. Anscombe
 Robert Audi
 Jonathan Bennett
 Maurice Blondel
 Michael Bratman
 Hector-Neri Castañeda
 David Charles
 August Cieszkowski
 Michel Crozier
 Jonathan Dancy
 Donald Davidson
 Daniel Dennett
 William H. Dray
 Fred Dretske
 Ignacio Ellacuría
 John Martin Fischer
 Harry Frankfurt
 Arnold Gehlen
 Carl Ginet
 Alvin I. Goldman
 Sam Harris
 Carl Hempel
 Jennifer Hornsby
 Rosalind Hursthouse
 John Hyman
 Hans Joas
 Robert Kane
 Anthony Kenny
 Jaegwon Kim
 Christine Korsgaard
 Tadeusz Kotarbiński
 Loet Leydesdorff
 John McDowell
 Alfred R. Mele
 Elijah Millgram
 Ludwig von Mises
 Thomas Nagel
 Lucy O'Brien
 Derk Pereboom (philosopher)
 Juan Antonio Pérez López
 Brian O'Shaughnessy
 Joseph Raz
 Thomas Reid
 Raymond Reiter
 Alfred Schütz
 Constantine Sandis
 John Searle
 Scott Sehon
 Wilfrid Sellars
 Michael Smith
 Baruch Spinoza
 Galen Strawson
 Charles Taylor
 Richard Taylor
 Judith Jarvis Thomson
 David Velleman
 Candace Vogler
 Georg Henrik von Wright
 R. Jay Wallace
 Susan Wolf
 Xavier Zubiri

See also
 Praxeology
 Free will
 
Cybernetics

References

Further reading 
 Maurice Blondel (1893). L'Action - Essai d'une critique de la vie et d'une science de la pratique
 G. E. M. Anscombe (1957). Intention, Basil Blackwell, Oxford.
 James Sommerville (1968). Total Commitment, Blondel's L'Action, Corpus Books.
 Michel Crozier, & Erhard Friedberg (1980). Actors and Systems Chicago: [University of Chicago Press].
 Donald Davidson (1980). Essays on Actions and Events, Clarendon Press, Oxford.
 Jonathan Dancy & Constantine Sandis (eds.) (2015). Philosophy of Action: An Anthology, Wiley-Blackwell, Oxford.
 Jennifer Hornsby (1980). Actions, Routledge, London.
 Lilian O'Brien (2014). Philosophy of Action, Palgrave, Basingstoke.  
 Christine Korsgaard (2008). The Constitution of Agency, Oxford University Press, Oxford.
 Alfred R. Mele (ed.) (1997). The Philosophy of Action, Oxford University Press, Oxford.
 John Hyman & Helen Steward (eds.) (2004). Agency and Action, Cambridge University Press, Cambridge.
 Anton Leist (ed.) (2007). Action in Context, Walter de Gruyter, Berlin.
 Timothy O'Connor & Constantine Sandis (eds.) (2010). A Companion to the Philosophy of Action, Wiley-Blackwell, Oxford.
 Sarah Paul (2020). The Philosophy of Action: A Contemporary Introduction, London, Routledge.
 Peter Šajda et al. (eds.) (2012). Affectivity, Agency and Intersubjectivity, L'Harmattan, Paris.
 Constantine Sandis (ed.) (2009). New Essays on the Explanation of Action, Palgrave Macmillan, Basingstoke.
 Constantine Sandis (ed.) (2019). Philosophy of Action from Suarez to Anscombe, London, Routledge.
 Michael Thompson (2012). Life and Action: Elementary Structures of Practice and Practical Thought, Boston, MA, Harvard University Press.
 Lawrence H. Davis (1979). Theory of Action, Prentice-Hall, (Foundations of Philosophy Series), Englewood Cliffs, NJ.

External links

The Meaning of Action by Various Authors at PhilosophersAnswer.com

Free will
Metaphysical theories
Metaphysics of mind
Neuroscience
Ontology
Theory of mind
Epistemological theories